Behara Seshadri Daya Sagar  also known as B. S. Daya Sagar (born in 1967 in India) is an Indian mathematical geoscientist specializing in mathematical morphology. He is a professor of computer science at the Indian Statistical Institute, Bangalore. He is known as a specialist in mathematical morphology, fractal geometry. chaos theory, and their applications in geophysics, geographical information science, and computational geography. The Indian Geophysical Union awarded him the Krishnan Medal in 2002. He is the first Asian to receive the Georges Matheron Lectureship in 2011. In 2018, he received the IAMG Certificate of Appreciation by the International Association for Mathematical Geosciences for his work on the
Handbook of Mathematical Geosciences. In 2020, Sagar was selected as an IEEE Distinguished Lecturer (DL) to represent the IEEE Geoscience and Remote Sensing Society.

Education
Sagar was educated at St. Anthony's School, Visakhapatnam, Government High School-Samalkota, and Government Arts College-Srikakulam, India. He graduated with BSc in 1987 from Shree Durga Prasad Saraf College of Arts and Applied Sciences, Sriramnagar, an affiliated college of Andhra University. Subsequently, he received MSc and PhD degrees from the Andhra University College of Engineering-Visakhapatnam, India, in 1991 and 1994 respectively. His PhD thesis is on 'Applications of Remote Sensing, Mathematical Morphology, and Fractals to Study Certain Surface Water Bodies'.

Career
After receiving his doctorate, Sagar worked in Andhra University College of Engineering as a research associate (1994–95 and 1998–98) of CSIR, and as a research scientist/principal investigator (1997-7) in the Scheme for Extramural Research for Young Scientists funded by Ministry of Science and Technology. From 1998 to 2001, he worked as a research scientist at the Centre for Remote Imaging Sensing and Processing (CRISP) of the National University of Singapore. He was appointed Associate Professor of Faculty of Engineering and Technology, Multimedia University (MMU), Malaysia in 2001 and was also a Deputy Chairman of the Centre for Applied Electromagnetics (2003–07) there. During 2007–13, he was an associate professor at the Indian Statistical Institute-Bangalore centre, and since 2009, he has been acting as founding head of SSIU, a unit established in 2009 as a constituent unit of its Computer and Communication Sciences Division. Since 2013, he has been a professor at the Indian Statistical Institute.

Research
Sagar's research contributions span both basic and applied fields, and involves the fusion of computer simulations and modeling techniques in order to develop cogent models in discrete space to gain an understanding of dynamical behavior of complex terrestrial systems, such as water bodies, river networks, mountain objects, folds, dunes, landscapes, and rock porous media. He developed specific technologies and spatial algorithms for using data acquired at multiple spatial and temporal scales for developing cogent domain-specific models. His work employs concepts stemmed out of recent theories—such as mathematical morphology, fractals, chaos, and morphometrics—to develop spatial algorithms for (i) pattern retrieval, (ii) pattern analysis, (iii) simulation and modeling, and (iv) reasoning and visualization of the spatial and temporal phenomena of terrestrial and GISci relevance. His studies show that there exist several open challenges that need to be addressed by mathematical geosciences community. One of such challenges is to understand the complexity in spatiotemporal behaviors of several terrestrial phenomena and processes via construction of process-specific attractors that may range from simple to strange.

Professional
Sagar has been honored with the Georges Matheron Lectureship Award of International Association for Mathematical Geosciences for outstanding research ability in the field of spatial statistics or mathematical morphology. In 2002 he received Krishnan Medal of the Indian Geophysical Union. As recipient of this medal, Sagar was made IGU Fellow in 2011. In 1995, he received Dr. Balakrishna Memorial Award from the Regional Centre of Andhra Pradesh Akademi of Sciences. He is an elected Fellow of Royal Geographical Society (1999), Fellow of Indian Geophysical Union (2011), Senior Member of IEEE (2003) and was a member of New York Academy of Science during 1995–96. Sagar was elected as a fellow by the Indian Academy of Sciences in 2022. He is on the Editorial Boards of Discrete Dynamics of Nature and Society, and Computers & Geosciences. He has published 80+ papers in peer reviewed international journals, 3 books, and 7 edited Special-Theme issues for well known journals. He has been on Editorial Boards of Computers & Geosciences, Mathematical Geosciences, and Discrete Dynamics in Nature & Society.

Professional activities
 Editor of Discrete Dynamics in Nature and Society: Multidisciplinary Research and Review Journal
 Editorial Board Member, Computers & Geosciences
 Editorial Board Member, Mathematical Geosciences
 Review Editor of Environmental Informatics-Frontiers (Frontiers Media)
 Associate Editor of Image Analysis & Stereology
 Founding Chairman, Bangalore Section IEEE GRSS Chapter

Honors and awards
 Member, Honors & Recognition Committee of American Geophysical Union (2022-2023)
 IEEE Geoscience and Remote Sensing Society Distinguished Lecturer (DL).
 Award of IAMG Certificate of Appreciation - 2018 from International Association for Mathematical Geosciences 
 Georges Matheron Lectureship Award-2011 from International Association for Mathematical Geosciences '
 CURZONCO-SESHACHALAM LECTURES-5(2009)
Krishnan Medal 2002 from Indian Geophysical Union
 Dr. Balakrishna Memorial Award 1995 from Regional Centre of Andhra Pradesh Akademi of Sciences
 Fellow, Indian Geophysical Union
 Fellow, Royal Geographical Society
 Fellow, Indian Academy of Sciences

Books

See also 
 International Association for Mathematical Geosciences

References

External links
 Daya Sagar's page at Indian Statistical Institute
 List of publications

Living people
1967 births
Andhra University alumni
Academic staff of the Indian Statistical Institute
Telugu people
Scientists from Visakhapatnam
Scientists from Bangalore
Mathematical morphology
Andhra University College of Engineering alumni
Fellows of the Indian Geophysical Union
Georges Matheron Lectureship recipients
Fellows of the Indian Academy of Sciences
Academic staff of the National University of Singapore
Multimedia University
20th-century Indian earth scientists
Fellows of the Royal Geographical Society
20th-century Indian mathematicians